"Pretty Little Angel Eyes" is a 1961 song by American singer Curtis Lee. It was released on Dunes Records, #45-2007. Phil Spector served as producer, and also produced Lee's follow-up hit "Under the Moon of Love".

Background
The track is in the doo-wop style, with backing vocals by the Halos. The Halos were a doo-wop group composed of Harold Johnson, Al Cleveland, Phil Johnson, and Arthur Crier (bass).

Chart history and performance

The song spent 11 weeks on the Billboard Hot 100, peaking at No. 7, while reaching No. 6 on the Cash Box Top 100, 
Outside the US, the song reached No. 5 on New Zealand's "Lever Hit Parade", No. 15 on Canada's CHUM Hit Parade, and No. 47 on the UK's Record Retailer chart.

The song was ranked No. 77 on Billboards end of year "Hot 100 for 1961 - Top Sides of the Year" and No. 56 on Cash Boxs "Top 100 Chart Hits of 1961".

Cover versions
Notable acts who have performed the song include:
Sha Na Na
Showaddywaddy

See also
List of 1960s one-hit wonders in the United States

References

1961 singles
1961 songs
Song recordings produced by Phil Spector
Songs written by Curtis Lee
Songs written by Tommy Boyce
Showaddywaddy songs